Frank Ferrer (born March 25, 1966) is an American rock drummer. He is best known as the drummer for hard rock band Guns N' Roses, with whom he has played, toured, and recorded since 2006. Ferrer was also a member of The Psychedelic Furs, Love Spit Love as well as The Beautiful. He has recorded and worked with several high profile musicians including Robi "Draco" Rosa, Tool, Gordon Gano, PJ Harvey, Tommy Stinson, Nena, Frank Black of The Pixies, Neil Young, Perry Farrell and Cheetah Chrome of The Dead Boys.

Career

The Beautiful (1988–1993) 
Ferrer was a member of New York based band The Beautiful. The band featured Ferrer on drums along with Jonathan Lacey on vocals and guitar, and bassist Perry Bottke. The band released a self-titled EP in 1990, and a full-length album Storybook, in May 1992.

Psychedelic Furs & Love Spit Love (1992–2008) 
Ferrer joined Love Spit Love in 1992. The band was formed by Richard Butler with Ferrer and Richard Fortus while The Psychedelic Furs were on hiatus. Love Spit Love released their self titled album Love Spit Love in 1994 and Trysome Eatone in 1997. During this time Ferrer also played on demos Dripping Goss' album Gift of Demise. From 2001 until 2008, Ferrer joined the touring lineup (along with Fortus) of The Psychedelic Furs.

The Compulsions (2004–present) 
Ferrer is drummer for the New York City based band The Compulsions. The band features Rob Carlyle on vocals and rhythm guitar, fellow Guns N' Roses member Richard Fortus on lead guitar, and bassist Sami Yaffa of Hanoi Rocks and The New York Dolls. In 2011, the band released their first full-length studio album, Beat The Devil.

Guns N' Roses (2006–present) 

In July 2006, Frank Ferrer joined Guns N' Roses during their European Tour to replace Bryan "Brain" Mantia, who had returned to the United States when his wife had a child. Tommy Stinson and Richard Fortus, whom Ferrer had both recorded with in the past, reached out to Ferrer to fill the drum position. Ferrer played his first show with the band on June 24, 2006, in Dessel, Belgium at Graspop Metal Meeting. Initially expected to be just a touring drummer filling in for 2 weeks, Ferrer became the official drummer in October 2006. He contributes drums to the tracks "Chinese Democracy", "Better", "If the World", "There Was a Time" and "I.R.S." on the album Chinese Democracy.

Ferrer toured with the group through the end of the Chinese Democracy Tour, as well as the Up Close and Personal Tour & Appetite for Democracy Tour. He appears in the live video release Appetite for Democracy 3D.

He took part in the reunion Not in This Lifetime... Tour, featuring classic-era members Slash and Duff McKagan, which circled the world from 2016-2019. He has continued to tour with them since.

The Dead Daisies (2013–2014) 

Ferrer toured with The Dead Daisies in 2013 and recorded drums for their 2014 EP Face I Love.

PSSR (2019-present) 
In 2019, Ferrer formed the hard rock band PSSR with singer/guitarist Eric J, bassist Brett Bass, and lead guitarist Rob Bailey, and released their first single "Busted". Two more singles were released in 2020, "Last Time" and "Push", and another in 2021 entitled "She's All Right".

Personal life 
Ferrer was born March 25, 1966, to Cuban parents and raised in New York. His father was a carpenter and Latin percussionist. At age 11, Ferrer saw KISS in concert at Madison Square Garden and fell in love with rock music. In 2021 he got married to a Polish model Magdalena Dziun

Equipment 
Ferrer uses DW drums, Remo drumheads, Sabian cymbals and Vater drumsticks.
His drum setup according to his official website consists of a 26x14" kick drum, a 12x12" rack tom and 14x14 and 16x16" floor toms, sometimes using 16x16 and 18x16 floor toms.
His Sabian cymbal setup varies from time to time along with drumheads. His choice of sticks are Vater Power 5Bs.
Ferrer uses a Latin percussion rock ridge rider cowbell and various handheld tambourines. He previously used Pork Pie Percussion drums and Zildjian cymbals until 2014.

Tours & live sessions

Tours 
The Beautiful	US
Love Spit Love		US/EUROPE
Rebecca Blasband 	US
Robi "Draco" Rosa	Latin America/Puerto Rico/US
Doro Pesch 	Germany
The Psychedelic Furs	US/Canada/UK
Gordon Gano            US
Guns N' Roses      Chinese Democracy Tour 2006 Europe, North America
Guns N' Roses      Chinese Democracy Tour 2007 Mexico, Australia, New Zealand, Japan
Guns N' Roses      Chinese Democracy Tour 2009/2011 Asia, North America, South America, Central America, Europe
Guns N' Roses      Up Close and Personal Tour United States, Europe
Guns N' Roses      Appetite for Democracy Tour Las Vegas, Nevada USA October 31, 2012 – November 24, 2012
Guns N' Roses      Not in this Lifetime... Tour United States, North America, South America, Australia, New Zealand, Europe

Live sessions 
Tool – February 1, 2012 – Izod Center East Rutherford, NJ.  Lateralus drum duel performance.
Tool – August 1, 2009 – All Points West Festival, Liberty Park, NJ.  Lateralus drum duel performance.
Tool – August 15, 2002 – Continental Arena, NJ. Second drummer on the song called "Triad".
Wyclef Jean – Reggae Sunsplash 1999
Tommy Stinson (Guns N' Roses/Replacements) – Series of shows in 2004 featuring Richard Fortus (Guns N' Roses)
Frank Black/Gordon Gano – October 11, 2003, Troubadour, LA
Thunderchucker Records – inception October 2004 New York, NY
Perry Farrell – live show at Hiro Ballroom, NYC fashion week 2005
Nena               Vienna, Austria 2008

References 

Discogs.com

External links

1966 births
American heavy metal drummers
Guns N' Roses members
Living people
Love Spit Love members
Musicians from New York (state)
The Psychedelic Furs members
The Dead Daisies members
American people of Cuban descent
American people of Catalan descent
20th-century American drummers
American male drummers